Karen Cliche (born July 22, 1976) is a Canadian actress. She is known for her roles as a regular on the television series Vampire High, Adventure Inc., Mutant X, Young Blades and Flash Gordon.

Early life
Cliche always wanted to act and did it in school. However, she thought she was "too ambitious to go into acting" and started to study psychology. During this time she already did some modeling and a bit later her modeling agency started an acting department. After studying psychology for a year Cliche decided to leave the university and wanted to focus on her acting career.

Career
In 2001 Cliche auditioned for a part in Vampire High. She was cast as the vampire Essie Rachimova.

In 2017, she played Jessica in Killer Mom. Jessica is a mother who first meets her daughter Allison and wants to be the mother Allison never had.

Personal life
Cliche married Brian Mellersh on September 24, 2005. They have a daughter, born on January 6, 2010.

Filmography

Film

Television

References

External links

1976 births
Anglophone Quebec people
Canadian film actresses
Canadian television actresses
Living people
People from Sept-Îles, Quebec